Lady Rothschild may refer to:

Emma Louise von Rothschild (1844–1935), wife of Nathan Rothschild, 1st Baron Rothschild
Barbara Judith Hutchinson (1911–1989), first wife of Victor Rothschild, 3rd Baron Rothschild between 1933 and 1946
Teresa Rothschild (1915–1996), second wife of Victor Rothschild, 3rd Baron Rothschild
Serena Rothschild (1935–2019), wife of Jacob Rothschild, 4th Baron Rothschild

See also
Baron Rothschild